Rattail orchid is a term referring to several more or less closely related orchid species, which have inflorescences or aerial roots resembling a rat's tail in shape. It can refer to:

 Dendrobium mortii (Pencil orchid)
 Dendrobium racemosum
 Dendrobium striolatum (Streaked rock orchid)
 Dendrobium tenuissimum
 Dockrillia teretifolia (Bridal-veil orchid)
 Oncidium cebolleta